"The Big One" is a song by English singer-songwriter Black, which was released by A&M in 1988 as the lead single from his second studio album Comedy. The song was written by Black and produced by Dave "Dix" Dickie. "The Big One" reached number 54 in the UK Singles Chart and remained in the top 100 for four weeks.

Background
"The Big One" was inspired by the breakdown of Vearncombe's first marriage and subsequent divorce. Speaking of the song's writing and recording, Black told Music & Media in 1988,

Critical reception
On its release, David Giles of Record Mirror wrote, "While not quite in the same class as the sublime 'Paradise', Col's newie ought to sell enough to keep him in black bedspreads for a few more months." He also praised the B-side, "You Are the One", for being "a rousing ballad full of drama". Marcus Alton of the Newark Advertiser stated, "Vearncombe croons back into our hearts after about a year away from Hitsville. Seems he's been staying in Soul City." Bob Eborall of the Ealing Leader described "The Big One" as being "pleasantly warm and relaxed for the autumn air".

Formats

Personnel
Credits are adapted from the UK CD single liner notes and the Comedy CD album booklet.

The Big One
 Black – lead vocals, guitar
 Dave Dix – keyboards
 Martin Green – saxophone
 Steve Pearce – bass
 Gavin Harrison – drums
 Martin Ditcham – percussion
 Derek Green – backing vocals

Production
 Dave Dix – producer (all tracks)
 Dave Anderson – engineer ("The Big One")
 Mike Pela – mixing engineer ("The Big One")

Charts

References

1988 songs
1988 singles
A&M Records singles
Black (singer) songs